Kistin — an old exoethnonym of all Nakh peoples (Ingush, Chechens, Batsbi), under which local societies later were designated, and conditionally divided into distant Kistins and nearby Kistins. In Russian sources of the XIX century, the term nearby Kistins referred to the inhabitants of the Kistin Gorge in the vicinity of river Armkhi, and distant Kistins referred to the inhabitants of the upper reaches of the Argun. Today the name is mostly used to refer to the Chechens who compactly live in the Pankisi Gorge of Georgia.

Outdated values:
 A collective name for all Nakh peoples used by Georgians (especially Pshavs and Khevsurs) in the recent past.
 A collective name for all Nakh peoples, used by several writers and researchers of the Caucasus (J.A. Guldenshtedt, S.M. Bronevsky, P. P. Zubov) in the 18th-19th centuries.

History 
In 1795, when describing the peoples inhabiting Russia, the Kists are mentioned as follows: Kistins, or Kisti, who are divided into different tracts of which it is known to exist: Chechens, Ingush and Karabulaks, they live along the Sunzha River, and in the middle mountains of the Caucasus.

The historian of the Caucasus S.M. Bronevsky described the borders of the Kist lands as follows:

Fyappiy (Vyappiy) 

The historical area where the Kists lived was called "Kisteti", as well as "Kistia" or "Kistinia". The Georgian prince, historian and geographer of the 18th century Vakhushti Bagrationi quite definitely localizes it along the gorge of the Armkhi river (the historical “Kistinka”), that is, in mountainous Ingushetia. Kists, in a narrow sense, as one of the Ingush societies, are noted in the “Review of the political state of the Caucasus in 1840”, and in 1851 in the “Military Statistical Review of the Russian Empire, published by the highest command at the 1st branch of the Department of the General headquarters". The Kist society, as part of Ingushetia, was part of the Vladikavkaz district, the Ossetian military district and the Ingush district.

They bordered in the west with the Dzherakhins, in the east with the Galgaevs, in the south with Georgia, in the north the borders reached the Tarskoye Valley. The Kist society was also synonymously called "Fyappinsky", after the name of its constituent ethno-territorial group - the Fyappins, and later, in the 2nd half of the 19th century, it became known as "Metskhalsky", after the name of the principal village Metskhal.

Kistin districts 
Guldenstedt divided the Kistins into the following districts:
 District (Kachilik) Endre and Yakhsay
 Achkingurt County
 Ardahl County 
 Vapi County
 Angusht County
 Shalkha District
 District of Chechen
 Atahi District
 Kulga District, or Dganti
 Galgai County
 Dshanti District
 Chabrillo County
 Shabet County
 Chishrikaker District
 Karabulak District
 Meesti County
 Meredji District
 Galashka County
 Duban County

References

Bibliography 
 Charles Vallencey. Collectanea de Rebus Hibernicis (англ.). — Dublin: Graisberry and Campbell, 1804. — Vol. VI. — 480 p.
 Johann Gottfried Eichhorn. Geschichte der Litteratur, von ihrem Anfang bis auf die neuesten Zeiten (нем.). — Göttingen: Bey Vandenhoek und Ruprecht, 1807. — Bd. 6. — 678 S.
 Johann Christoph Adelung. Mithridates, oder allgemeine Sprachenkunde mit dem Vater Unser als Sprachprobe in beynahe fünfhundert Sprachen und Mundarten (нем.). — Berlin: In der Vossischen Buchandlung, 1806. — 686 S.
 Sir Richard Phillips. A Geographical View of the World: Embracing the Manners, Customs, and Pursuits, of Every Nation; Founded on the Best Authorities (англ.). — New York: E. Hopkins and W. Reed, 1826. — 406 p.
 Butkov P. G. Opinion about the book: Slavic antiquities // Three ancient treaties of the Russians with the Norwegians and the Swedes. — St. Petersburg: Printing house of the Ministry of Internal Affairs, 1837. — 398 p.
 Caucasian Territory // Military Statistical Review of the Russian Empire: published by the highest order at the 1st branch of the Department of the General Staff. — St. Petersburg: Printing house of the Department of the General Staff, 1851. — T. 16. Part 1. — 274 p.
 Chulkov M.D., Zakharov A., Kolpashnikov A.Ya., Sablin N.Ya. Historical description of Russian commerce at all ports and borders from ancient times to the present and all the predominant legalizations on this sovereign, Emperor Peter the Great and now safely reigning Empress Empress Catherine the Great / M. D. Chulkov. - M .: University printing house at N. Novikov, 1785. - T. II. — 674 p.

History of the North Caucasus
Peoples of the Caucasus
Ingushetia
Chechnya
Nakh peoples
Ethnonyms of the Ingush